The 1050s BC is a decade which lasted from 1059 BC to 1050 BC.

Events and trends
 1057 BC–According to Josephus, Solomon's Temple finishes construction on January 19. This predates secular estimates by more than 120 years and is not considered reliable or accurate.  
 1054 BC–Shamshi-Adad IV, son of Tiglath-Pileser I, usurps the Assyrian throne from his nephew, Eriba-Adad II.
 1053 BC—Death of Kang, king of the Zhou of ancient China. In September, a five-planetary alignment occurs.
 1052 BC—Zhao succeeds Kang.
 1051 BC—Saul becomes the first King of Ancient Israel.
 1050 BC—Death of Shamshi-Adad IV; his son, Ashurnasirpal I, succeeds him as King of Assyria.
 1050 BC—Philistines capture the Ark of the Covenant from Israel in battle. (Approximate date)
 c. 1050 BC—Shang Dynasty ends in Ancient China, replaced by the Zhou Dynasty.
 c. 1050 BC—Proto-Geometric period starts in Ancient Greece.

Significant people
 Simbar-shipak, king of Babylon, is born (approximate date).
 Ish-Bosheth, king of Israel, is born (approximate date).